St. Francis Xavier School is a coeducational secondary school situated on Darlington Road, Richmond, North Yorkshire, England. It is a joint Roman Catholic and Church of England school, serving children and young people aged 11–16 from both denominations and other backgrounds. The headteacher is S Keelan-Beardsley.

Previously a voluntary aided school administered by North Yorkshire County Council, in June 2019 St Francis Xavier School converted to academy status. The school is part of a multi-academy trust, Nicholas Postgate Catholic Academy Trust.

Inspections by Ofsted

As of 2022, the school was last inspected by Ofsted before it became an academy, in 2012. The judgement was Outstanding.

References

External links 

Visit the school website by clicking here
Ofsted Report, 2009

Secondary schools in North Yorkshire
Catholic secondary schools in the Diocese of Middlesbrough
Church of England secondary schools in the Diocese of Leeds
Richmond, North Yorkshire
Academies in North Yorkshire